Felt is a 2011 album by German composer Nils Frahm. It was released on 7 October 2011 on Erased Tapes records. The name of the record refers to Nils placing felt on the strings of his piano, initially to dampen the sound to enable nighttime playing and later as he liked the sound it produced. The album was also recorded with the microphones deep within the piano which was seen to provide a more intimate sound.

Reception

On its release the album received critical acclaim. At Metacritic, which assigns a normalised rating out of 100 to reviews from mainstream critics, the album has received a score of 87, based on 5 reviews which is categorised as "Universal Acclaim". In his 8/10 review for PopMatters, Mike Schiller said the album was "sublime and beautiful" and "a humble little masterpiece". Al Horner at Drowned in Sound called Felt, "a body of music so intimate and hushed you can practically hear the microphones breathing" and "a captivating listen".

Track listing

References

2011 albums
Nils Frahm albums
Erased Tapes Records albums